The Siesta Key Observer (previously known as the Pelican Press) is an American weekly free newspaper serving Siesta Key, Florida. Founded in 1971 by John and Elizabeth Davidson, it is now a part of a family of twelve community and business newspapers published by Observer Media Group.

History
In March 1971, John and Elizabeth Davidson began publishing a six-page paper called The Key News to the Key. The Davidsons later renamed the paper to the Siesta Key Pelican.

The name of the publication changed again to Pelican Press.
In 1998 the paper was purchased by Journal Media Group, based in Milwaukee, Wisconsin, joining a large publication family with interests in other states.

In 2011, Journal Media Group sold Pelican Press to Sarasota-based Observer Media Group (OMG). In 2015, OMG changed the name to the Siesta Key Observer.

In 2016, Emily Walsh was named publisher of Siesta Key Observer.

References

External links
 

Newspapers published in Florida
Newspapers established in 1971
Sarasota, Florida
1971 establishments in Florida
Weekly newspapers published in the United States